This is a list of counties of Albania in an alphabetically ordered list by population and population density.

County by population

County by population density

References

 
Albania, population
Albania, population